The Oldham Advertiser is a weekly newspaper which serves the Metropolitan Borough of Oldham, Greater Manchester, England. Established in 1982, it is owned by Reach plc, as part of MEN Media which contains a collection of newspapers across North West England including the Manchester Evening News. In 2010, the then owners Guardian Media Group, decided to sell the Advertiser along with 22 other local and regional titles to Trinity Mirror plc.

See also
Oldham Evening Chronicle

External links
Official site

References

Mass media in the Metropolitan Borough of Oldham
Publications established in 1982
Newspapers published in Greater Manchester
1982 establishments in England
Newspapers published by Reach plc